Lucton is a village near the town of Leominster  in  the county of Herefordshire, England. It  is best known for being the location of Lucton School, an independent, mixed-gender day and boarding school.

References

Villages in Herefordshire